Forney is a city in Kaufman County, Texas, United States, and has been named by the Texas Legislature as the "Antique Capital of Texas". It is part of the Dallas–Fort Worth metroplex. Its population was 14,661 at the 2010 census, up from 5,588 at the 2000 census; in 2020, its population was 23,455.

Geography 

Forney is located in northwestern Kaufman County at 32°45'5" North, 96°28'2" West (32.751521, –96.467225). U.S. Route 80 passes through the city as a four-lane limited-access highway, leading west  to the center of Dallas and east  to Terrell.

Climate 
On April 3, 2012, an EF-3 tornado struck the city as part of the tornado outbreak of that date. Several homes were completely destroyed, and many others were severely damaged in the Diamond Creek subdivision. The tornado caused significant roof damage to Crosby Elementary School in Forney. A car in the parking lot of the school was tossed about 300 yards and found in a field. Less severe damage was reported in downtown Forney and to a dry cleaning business. Despite the severe damage, no deaths occurred, but seven people sustained injuries from the tornado. No deaths were reported from either the Forney tornado or any other tornado that day.

Demographics 

As of the 2020 United States census, there were 23,455 people, 7,624 households, and 5,812 families residing in the city.

Education 

The Forney Independent School District serves Forney, Talty, an annex of Mesquite, and part of the community of Heartland. Forney is served by several elementary schools, Warren Middle School, Brown Middle School, Forney High School, and North Forney High School. In 2010, the district received an academic rating of "Exemplary" based on the test results of the Texas Assessment of Knowledge and Skills. The district also has an eBook program, where students in high school, middle school, and elementary school beginning in the fifth grade are provided with a laptop for schoolwork.

In June 2022, the Forney Independent School District announced a new dress code that bans all "hoodies" and hooded coats and jackets. It also bans dresses, skirts, and skorts for all except kids in prekindergarten through the fourth grade in an effort the district says will “help prepare students for a safe and successful future.”

Notable people

 Darlene Cates, actress
 Stormy Daniels, actress, stripper, screenwriter, and director
 Tex Erwin, Major League Baseball player
 Evan Gattis, MLB player, Houston Astros
 Josh Geer, MLB player, San Diego Padres
 Caleb Hanie, NFL player
 William Madison McDonald, politician, educator, businessman
 John Wiley Price, Dallas County commissioner
 Don Willett, former Texas Supreme Court associate justice, current Fifth Circuit judge

Climate
The climate in this area is characterized by hot, humid summers and generally mild to cool winters.  According to the Köppen climate classification, Forney has a humid subtropical climate,Cfa on climate maps.

References

External links

 Official website
 Forney Chamber of Commerce
 Forney Historic Preservation League & Spellman Museum of Forney History
 Forney Independent School District
 Forney Economic Development Corporation
 Online Local News, Sports, Discussion Boards, Online Business Directory, and Event Calendar in Forney, Texas
 Forney entry in Handbook of Texas Online

Dallas–Fort Worth metroplex
Cities in Texas
Cities in Kaufman County, Texas